Karl Collins is an English actor. He is known for his television roles as Danny Glaze in The Bill, Louis Loveday in Hollyoaks, and Shaun Temple in Doctor Who.

Early life and career

Collins was born in Nottingham, and grew up on the Clifton housing estate. As a child, he was a member of the Central Junior Television Workshop, and appeared in the programmes Dramarama and Your Mother Wouldn't Like It.

He played a car thief called 'Craven' in EastEnders in the early 90s, stealing a car from Frank Butcher's car lot.

He has played DC Danny Glaze in The Bill,  and has appeared in Casualty, Holby City, By Any Means, As Time Goes By and 55 Degrees North. He also appeared in Shane Meadows' debut film, Twenty Four Seven.

In 2011, he appeared in "The Entire History of You", an episode of the anthology series Black Mirror.

In 2015, he appeared in "Our Zoo".

He also appeared in the theatre production One Monkey Don't Stop No Show in 2013.

Collins appeared in the Doctor Who Christmas Special  "The End of Time", aired over the 2009 Christmas period, as Shaun Temple, Donna Noble's fiance.

On 10 February 2015, it was announced that Collins would be joining Channel 4 soap opera Hollyoaks as new regular character Louis Loveday. He made his first appearance on 3 March 2015 and departed on 22 January 2019 when Louis was killed off by Breda McQueen (Moya Brady).

Filmography

Film

Television

Theatre credits

References

External links

Karl Collins at Hobsons Agency

English people of Nigerian descent
English male film actors
English male television actors
Black British male actors
Male actors from Nottinghamshire
People from Clifton, Nottinghamshire
Living people
Year of birth missing (living people)